Kamo is a village in the Akhuryan Municipality of the Shirak Province of Armenia. The village was named after Kamo, the nom de guerre of Simon Ter-Petrossian (1882-1922).

Demographics

References 

World Gazeteer: Armenia – World-Gazetteer.com

Populated places in Shirak Province